Nina Byron (born Nina Clarice Betts, July 27, 1900 – January 21, 1987) was a New Zealand-American silent film actress.

Film actress
In 1916, Byron came to America with her mother while her father stayed behind in New Zealand and committed suicide. She studied dancing, went on tour, and joined the Hitchykoo company. Only a year after coming to New York City, Byron came to Los Angeles to make Truthful Tulliver (1917) with William S. Hart. As Abby Hope in The Heir of the Ages (1917), Byron was described by a critic as having substantial acting skills. She was the ingenue (stock character) for House Peters. The material she was given to work with, according to the reviewer, did not test her ability. He likens Byron's laughter in the film to Mary Pickford. Her character was merely required to laugh like the silent film icon. Her other film credits are for roles in The Cruise of the Make-Believes (1918), The Source (1918), The Dub (1919), Johnny Get Your Gun (1919), The Boomerang (1919), and The Broken Butterfly (1919).

Ziegfeld Follies
Byron was a member of the Ziegfeld Follies in 1925, after she was out of movies. Her fellow dancers included Ruth Fallows, Helen MacDonald, and Doris Lloyd. In February 1925 they performed at the Moulin Rouge. Byron was a musical comedy theater performer on Broadway and was associated with Eddie Cantor. She was among the 100 travelers who returned to Los Angeles aboard the Dollar around-the-world liner President Wilson in March 1929. Others included John Barrymore and his bride, Dolores Costello. Byron was featured in the Florenz Ziegfeld show, Woopee, in 1929. The cruise she returned from was a trip through the tropics and up the west coast.

Personal life
In June 1922 Nicholas Dunaew, actor and leading man with Pauline Frederick, sued Byron for divorce. Dunaew was also a film director who desired to produce a series of anti-Bolshevist motion pictures. He resided at the Green Room Club in New York at the time. In his divorce petition he stated that he had "attempted to lift his wife from poverty to his own level, but failed." He concluded by saying "one cannot make a silk purse from a sow's ear." Dunaew met Byron in New York when she was at the Auguste and Louis Lumière studio having some pictures taken. He quickly fell in love with her and brought her, together with mother, to Los Angeles. Byron and Dunaew married in September 1918 and resided at 1504 McCadden Place in Hollywood. They separated on January 4, 1920. Dunaew claimed Byron deserted him. It was during the time she was a member of the Hitchykoo troupe that he did not see her again. Dunaew made reference to Byron's reprehensible conduct which he later became aware of through his friends.

Her second marriage was to cinematographer Harold Rosson in 1924. The two divorced in 1926, and she married set designer Frank Hotaling in 1939, with whom she remained married to until his death.

References

External links

Nina Byron portrait, 1917 (archived)

New Zealand film actresses
New Zealand silent film actresses
New Zealand female dancers
Vaudeville performers
1900 births
1987 deaths
People from Christchurch
Ziegfeld girls
New Zealand emigrants to the United States